Friedrich Wilhelm Ludwig Hartmann (3 August 1836 – 14 February 1910) was a German composer and music critic.

Life 
Born in Neuss, Hartmann was the son of music director in Neuss, Friedrich Hartmann. He was educated at the University of Music and Theatre Leipzig under Moscheles and Hauptmann and then went to Weimar as a pupil of Franz Liszt. He appeared at a concert given by Schröder-Devrient at Dresden in 1859. From 1859 until his death, he lived in Dresden. Latterly he was almost exclusively employed in musical journalism.

Hartmann died in Dresden at the age of 73.

His grave is in the Hartmann family grave in the  there. His wife Louise, daughter of the lawyer Julius von Kirchmann, also found her final resting place there.

Work 
Of Hartmann's compositions, his lieds and ballades in particular have been widely circulated, but he was also successful as a composer of piano music and pianist. As a music writer and critic, he became respected in Dresden. In his more than 50 years of activity, he championed Richard Wagner and Richard Strauss and supported young singers at the Semperoper. He published various writings about Wagner and contributed numerous articles to periodical literature.

 König Helga, opera

Further reading 
 Kristina Popova (ed.): Die Dresdner Gesellschaft in Porträtzeichnungen von Robert Sterl. Robert Sterl Haus, Naundorf 2007, p. 8f.
 Hartmann on Retrobibliothek

References

External links 
 
 

20th-century classical composers
20th-century German composers
20th-century German writers
German music critics
1836 births
1910 deaths
People from Neuss